Clint Michael Fagan (born October 21, 1981) is a former umpire in Major League Baseball (MLB). He worked in MLB between 2011 and 2017, and wore number 82 on his uniform.

Career
Fagan umpired his first MLB game on June 27, 2011. He worked a total of 90 games during his first three MLB seasons, and worked over 100 games during each of the next three seasons – through the end of the 2017 season, Fagan has umpired a total of 522 games.

Notable games
Fagan was an umpire for the 2012 Triple-A All-Star Game, and for the 2013 World Baseball Classic.

On June 2, 2013, Fagan ejected Yadier Molina of the St. Louis Cardinals after Molina threw his helmet upon being called out at first base by Fagan; Molina became irate, and St. Louis manager Mike Matheny was subsequently ejected by Fagan while arguing. On June 11, 2013, Fagan issued six ejections in a game between the Los Angeles Dodgers and the Arizona Diamondbacks; two due to an intentional hit by pitch, and four due to a brawl.

Personal life
Fagan resides in Georgetown, Texas, with his family; he additionally works as an attorney.

See also
 List of Major League Baseball umpires

References

External links
Retrosheet
Close Call Sports

1981 births
Living people
Sportspeople from Houston
Major League Baseball umpires